Michael Ohioze (born 6 February 1995) is a British athlete who competes in the sprints, predominantly the 400 metres.

Ohioze studied at St. Ambrose University in Iowa after earning a scholarship, initially for soccer, graduating in May 2017 with a Bachelor of Arts degree in Physical Education on along with additional majors in sports management and philosophy. Ohioze was a 10 time All-American for his results in track and field. Ohioze then joined the Graduate Kinesiology program at Saint Mary's College of California.

On 26 June 2021 Ohioze came third at the 2021 British Athletics Championships 400 metres race. Three days later he was named in the sprinter pool for the 4 x 400 metres relay at the delayed 2020 Summer Games.

References

External links
 

1995 births
Living people
British male sprinters
Athletes from London
Black British sportsmen
English expatriate sportspeople in the United States
St. Ambrose Fighting Bees men's soccer players
College men's track and field athletes in the United States
Athletes (track and field) at the 2020 Summer Olympics
Olympic athletes of Great Britain
Association footballers not categorized by position
Association football players not categorized by nationality